{{DISPLAYTITLE:C10H6O2}}
The molecular formula C10H6O2 (molar mass: 158.15 g/mol, exact mass: 158.0368 u) may refer to:

 Naphthoquinone
 1,2-Naphthoquinone
 1,4-Naphthoquinone